Radical chic is the fashionable practice of upper-class people associating with politically radical people and causes. Coined in the 1970 article "Radical Chic: That Party at Lenny's" by journalist Tom Wolfe, the term has become widely used in languages such as American English, French, and Italian. Unlike dedicated activists, revolutionaries, or dissenters, those who engage in "radical chic" remain frivolous political agitators—ideologically invested in their cause of choice only so far as it advances their social standing.

The concept has been described as "an exercise in double-tracking one's public image: on the one hand, defining oneself through committed allegiance to a radical cause, but on the other, vitally, demonstrating this allegiance because it is the fashionable, au courant way to be seen in moneyed, name-conscious Society." "Terrorist chic" is a modern expression with similar connotations. This derivative, however, de-emphasizes the class satire of Wolfe's original term, instead accentuating concerns over the semiotics of radicalism (such as the aestheticization of violence).

Origin and meaning 
The phrase "radical chic" originated in a 1970 New York article by Tom Wolfe, titled "Radical Chic: That Party at Lenny's", which was later reprinted in his books Radical Chic & Mau-Mauing the Flak Catchers and The Purple Decades. In the essay, Wolfe used the term to satirize composer Leonard Bernstein and his friends for their absurdity in hosting a fundraising party for the Black Panthers—an organization whose members, activities, and goals were clearly incongruous with those of Bernstein's elite circle. Wolfe's concept of radical chic was intended to lampoon individuals  (particularly social elites like the jet set) who endorsed leftist radicalism merely to affect worldliness, assuage white guilt, or garner prestige, rather than to affirm genuine political convictions.

Background 

The concept of "fashionable" espousal of radical causes by members of wealthy society in this case had been argued against by Bernstein's wife, Felicia Montealegre, prior to the publication of "Radical Chic: That Party at Lenny's", a fact Wolfe details in it. The essay appeared in the June 8, 1970 issue of New York, 20 weeks after the actual fund raiser at the Bernstein residence was held on January 14. The first report of the event--which raised money in support of the Panther 21--appeared the following day in a piece by The New York Times style reporter Charlotte Curtis, who was in attendance. Curtis wrote in part: "Leonard Bernstein and a Black Panther leader argued the merits of the Black Panther party's philosophy before nearly 90 guests last night in the Bernsteins' elegant Park Avenue duplex." According to Wolfe, the release of the story worldwide was followed by strong criticism of the event: "The English, particularly, milked the story for all it was worth and seemed to derive one of the great cackles of the year from it."

The negative reaction prompted publication of an op-ed in the Times on January 16 entitled "False Note on Black Panthers" that was severely critical of the Black Panther Party and Bernstein:

Felicia Montealegre wrote and personally delivered a response to this op-ed to the Times offices. In her response she wrote:

Related terms 

Terrorist chic (also known as "terror chic" or "militant chic") is a more recent and specific variation of the term. It refers to the appropriation of symbols, objects, and aesthetics related to radical militants, usually in the context of pop culture or fashion. When such imagery is deployed subversively, the process exemplifies aestheticization of propaganda. Regardless, because terrorist chic derives its iconography from groups and individuals often associated with violent conflict or terrorism, the term carries a greater pejorative tone than "radical chic."

Instances of terrorist chic have variously been interpreted as morally irresponsible, earnestly counter-cultural, ironically hip, or benignly apolitical. According to Henry K. Miller of the New Statesman, the most well-known example is the ubiquitous appearance of Marxist revolutionary Che Guevara in popular culture. Other cases that have been labeled terrorist chic include: the Prada-Meinhof fashion line (a pun on Prada and the Baader-Meinhof Gang) and the fashion of combining keffiyehs and military-style clothing such as camo prints and heavy boots, outside the Arab World.

Shortly after the October 17, 1997 burial with military honors in Santa Clara, Cuba of Guevara's disinterred and identified remains, found in the Bolivian jungle by forensic anthropologists, The New York Times columnist Richard Bernstein argued that the third-world revolution that Che embodied was no longer even a "drawing-room, radical-chic hope". Concurrent with his re-burial, three major Guevara biographies were published in 1997. Noting the sustained interest in Che, Bernstein suggested that "the end of the cold war and the failure of the third-world revolution" allowed for the "scrutiny of Guevara, [as] a symbol of both the idealism and the moral blindness of the decade of protest" to take place in a context "free of ideological partisanship and rancor." Ted Balaker, editor-in-chief of Reason TV, an American libertarian website, wrote and produced Killer Chic in 2008, a libertarian, anti-Communist documentary, in which he deconstructed the use of images of Che Guevara and Mao Zedong in popular culture. In his blog entry on 11 December 2008, Reason journalist Nick Gillespie used the term "killer chic" in his review of Steven Soderbergh's film Che.

See also

References

Further reading 
 .
 .

External links

Lists of examples 
 Darling, it's so radical chic
 Radical sheep
 The revolution will not be accessorised
 'Radical Chic' Loses Luster by Joshua Goodman, Sun Journal, November 26, 2007
 TERROr.chic – the artist

Essays and editorials 
 Come the revolution, we'll all be in combats
 Analysis: Radical Chic
 M.I.A. - Terrorist Chic

Cultural trends
Fashion aesthetics
Mass media issues
Neologisms
Pejorative terms for women
Political activism
Political terminology
Semiotics
Social class subcultures
Terrorism
Tom Wolfe
Upper class culture
Political slurs for people